1935 in sports describes the year's events in world sport.

Alpine skiing
FIS Alpine World Ski Championships
5th FIS Alpine World Ski Championships are held at Mürren, Switzerland.  The events are a downhill, a slalom and a combined race in both the men's and women's categories.  The winners are:
 Men's Downhill – Franz Zingerle (Austria)
 Men's Slalom – Anton Seelos (Austria)
 Men's Combined – Anton Seelos (Austria)
 Women's Downhill – Christl Cranz (Germany)
 Women's Slalom – Anny Rüegg (Switzerland)
 Women's Combined – Christl Cranz (Germany)

American football
 NFL Championship: the Detroit Lions won  26–7 over the New York Giants at University of Detroit Stadium
 Rose Bowl (1934 season):
 The Alabama Crimson Tide won 29–13 over the Stanford Indians to share the college football national championship
 Minnesota Golden Gophers – college football national championship shared with SMU Mustangs
 First Heisman Trophy presented to Jay Berwanger of the University of Chicago
The Maxwell Football Club of Philadelphia was founded

Association football
England
 First Division – Arsenal win the 1934–35 title, becoming only the second team to win the title three times in a row.
 FA Cup – Sheffield Wednesday beat West Bromwich Albion 4–2.
Spain
 La Liga won by Betis Balompié
Germany
 Origin of the DFB-Pokal, which is Germany's premier national cup competition, in the institution of the "Tschammer-Pokal", a competition with Nazi affiliations that is terminated at the end of World War II. It is then restored as the DFB-Pokal in the 1952–53 season.
 National Championship – FC Schalke 04 6–4 VfB Stuttgart
 Tschammer-Pokal – 1. FC Nürnberg 2–0 FC Schalke 04 in Düsseldorf
Italy
 Serie A won by Juventus
Portugal
 The inaugural Primeira Liga is won by F.C. Porto
France
 French Division 1 won by Sochaux-Montbéliard
Brazil
 January 25 – São Paulo Futebol Clube founded.

Australian rules football
VFL Premiership
 5 October – Collingwood wins the 39th VFL Premiership, defeating South Melbourne 11.12 (78) to 7.16 (58) in the 1935 VFL Grand Final
 Brownlow Medal awarded to Haydn Bunton, Sr. (Fitzroy)
South Australian National Football League
 5 October – South Adelaide wins their first premiership since 1899, beating Port Adelaide 15.9 (99) to 13.13 (91)
 Magarey Medal awarded to Jack Cockburn (South Adelaide)
Western Australian National Football League
 12 October – West Perth win their seventh premiership, defeating Subiaco 11.8 (74) to 7.9 (51)
 Sandover Medal awarded to Lou Daily (Subiaco) and George Krepp (Swan Districts)

Baseball

 Detroit Tigers defeat Chicago Cubs 4–2 in the World Series
 MVPs:
 American League: Hank Greenberg, Detroit Tigers
 National League: Gabby Hartnett, Chicago Cubs
 On May 25, Babe Ruth has a last hurrah, hitting three home runs against the Pittsburgh Pirates. The final one, the last of his 714 career home runs, sets a baseball record that stood for 39 years. This homer is the first to clear the right field grandstand at Forbes Field and is measured at 600 feet (183 m).
 June 2 –  Babe Ruth announces he is going to retire from the sport.
 The Winnipeg Maroons win the Northern League championship.
 Japanese club Hanshin Tigers, officially founded in Osaka on December 10.

Basketball
Events
 Eurobasket 1935, won by Latvia, is the first European international basketball championship.
 The fourth South American Basketball Championship in Rio de Janeiro is won by Argentina.

Boxing
Events
 13 June – James J. Braddock defeats Max Baer over fifteen rounds at Long Island City to win the World Heavyweight Championship
Lineal world champions
 World Heavyweight Championship – Max Baer → James J. Braddock
 World Light Heavyweight Championship – Bob Olin → John Henry Lewis
 World Middleweight Championship – vacant
 World Welterweight Championship – Jimmy McLarnin → Barney Ross
 World Lightweight Championship – vacant → Tony Canzoneri
 World Featherweight Championship – vacant
 World Bantamweight Championship – Panama Al Brown → Sixto Escobar
 World Flyweight Championship – vacant → Benny Lynch

Cricket
Events
 England tour the West Indies, and tie a four-Test series at one win each with two draws
 9 March – The inaugural Ranji Trophy final begins a season after the death of K. S. Ranjitsinhji, in whose memory the trophy was awarded
England
 County Championship – Yorkshire
 Minor Counties Championship – Middlesex Second Eleven
 Most runs – Wally Hammond 2,616 @ 49.37 (HS 252)
 Most wickets – Tich Freeman 212 @ 21.51 (BB 8–40)
 South Africa defeat England one Test to nil with four draws
Australia
 Sheffield Shield – Victoria
 Most runs – Jack Fingleton 880 @ 58.66 (HS 134)
 Most wickets – Chuck Fleetwood-Smith 63 @ 20.34 (BB 8–113)
South Africa
 Currie Cup – not contested
India
 Bombay Quadrangular – Muslims
 Ranji Trophy – Bombay defeat Northern India by 208 runs
New Zealand
 Plunket Shield – Canterbury
West Indies
 Inter-Colonial Tournament – British Guiana

Cycling
Tour de France
 Romain Maes wins the 29th Tour de France
 Francisco Cepeda becomes the first rider to die during a Tour de France when he falls from his bike descending into a ravine
Giro d'Italia
 Vasco Bergamaschi of Maino wins the 23rd Giro d'Italia
Vuelta a España
 The first edition of what will eventually become of one road bicycle racing's Grand Tours is raced and won by Gustaaf Deloor.

Golf
Men's professional
 Masters Tournament – Gene Sarazen fired a double eagle on the 15th hole in the final round to force an 18-hole playoff which Sarazen would win the next day.
 U.S. Open – Sam Parks, Jr.
 British Open – Alf Perry
 PGA Championship – Johnny Revolta
Men's amateur
 British Amateur – Lawson Little
 U.S. Amateur – Lawson Little
Women's professional
 Women's Western Open – Opal Hill

Horse racing
Steeplechases
 Cheltenham Gold Cup – Golden Miller
 Grand National – Reynoldstown
Flat races
 Australia – Melbourne Cup won by Marabou
 Canada – King's Plate won by Sally Fuller
 France – Prix de l'Arc de Triomphe won by Samos
 Ireland – Irish Derby Stakes won by Museum
 English Triple Crown Races:
 2,000 Guineas Stakes – Bahram
 The Derby – Bahram
 St. Leger Stakes –  Bahram
 United States Triple Crown Races:
 Kentucky Derby – Omaha
 Preakness Stakes – Omaha
 Belmont Stakes – Omaha

Ice hockey
 4 April to 9 April – Montreal Maroons sweep Toronto Maple Leafs 3–0 to win the Stanley Cup
 Norway – The Norwegian Ice Hockey League was established

Motorsport

Nordic skiing
FIS Nordic World Ski Championships
 9th FIS Nordic World Ski Championships 1935 are held at Vysoké Tatry, Czechoslovakia

Rowing
The Boat Race
 6 April — Cambridge wins the 87th Oxford and Cambridge Boat Race

Rugby league
1935 European Rugby League Championship / 1935–36 European Rugby League Championship
1935 New Zealand rugby league season
1935 NSWRFL season
1934–35 Northern Rugby Football League season / 1935–36 Northern Rugby Football League season

Rugby union
 48th Home Nations Championship series is won by Ireland

Snooker
 World Snooker Championship – Joe Davis beats Willie Smith 25–20

Speed skating
Speed Skating World Championships
 Men's All-round Champion – Michael Staksrud (Norway)

Tennis
Australia
 Australian Men's Singles Championship – Jack Crawford (Australia) defeats Fred Perry (Great Britain) 2–6, 6–4, 6–4, 6–4
 Australian Women's Singles Championship – Dorothy Round Little (Great Britain) defeats Nancy Lyle Glover (Australia) 1–6, 6–1, 6–3
England
 Wimbledon Men's Singles Championship – Fred Perry (Great Britain) defeats Gottfried von Cramm (Germany) 6–2, 6–4, 6–4
 Wimbledon Women's Singles Championship – Helen Wills Moody (USA) defeats Helen Jacobs (USA) 6–3, 3–6, 7–5
France
 French Men's Singles Championship – Fred Perry (Great Britain) defeats Gottfried von Cramm (Germany) 6–3, 3–6, 6–1, 6–3
 French Women's Singles Championship – Hilde Krahwinkel Sperling (Germany) defeats Simonne Mathieu (France) 6–2, 6–1
USA
 American Men's Singles Championship – Wilmer Allison (USA) defeats Sidney Wood (USA) 6–2, 6–2, 6–3
 American Women's Singles Championship – Helen Jacobs (USA) defeats Sarah Palfrey Cooke (USA) 6–2, 6–4
Davis Cup
 1935 International Lawn Tennis Challenge –  at 5–0  (14) Centre Court, Wimbledon (grass) London, United Kingdom

Awards
 Associated Press Male Athlete of the Year – Joe Louis, Boxing
 Associated Press Female Athlete of the Year – Helen Wills Moody, Tennis

Notes
The medal was originally awarded to Daily on a "casting vote", but it was forgotten that a countback would decide the medal in the event of tie – so both were given the medal after this error was discovered, since Krepp would have won outright had the countback been done first.

References

 
Sports by year